The 2002 Africa Cup second division was the second edition of lower level rugby union tournament in Africa.
The teams were divided in two pools, with a final between the winner of each pool.

Regional pools

Pool North

Pool South

Final

See also 
 2002 Africa Cup

References and notes 

2002
2002 rugby union tournaments for national teams
2002 in African rugby union